The Scales of Justice is a lost 1914 silent film drama directed by Thomas N. Heffron and starring Paul McAllister, a stage actor. It was produced by Adolph Zukor and distributed on State Rights basis.

Cast
Paul McAllister - Robert Darrow
Jane Fearnley - Edith Russell Dexter
Harold Lockwood - Frank Dexter
Hal Clarendon - Walter Elliott
Mark Price - Philip Russell
Katherine Lee - Alice Dexter (as Catherine Lee)
Mary Blackburn - Angelina
Beatrice Moreland - Miss Tripp
Daniel Jarrett - Bill Crump

References

External links

1914 films
American silent feature films
Lost American films
Famous Players-Lasky films
Films directed by Thomas N. Heffron
American black-and-white films
Silent American drama films
1914 drama films
1914 lost films
Lost drama films
1910s American films